Hilly Eye are an American two-piece band formed in 2009. The band is fronted by Amy Klein, a former guitarist and violinist of the band Titus Andronicus. They signed to Don Giovanni Records in 2012.

Discography

Albums

EPs

References

External links
 Don Giovanni Records Official Website

2009 establishments in New York City
Don Giovanni Records artists